Roepstorff is a German-origin Danish surname. Notable persons include:

 Frederik Adolph de Roepstorff (1842–1883), Danish ethnologist and penal colony superintendent
 Hans Roepstorff (1910–1945), German chess player
 Jens Roepstorff (born 1960), Danish handball player
 Kirstine Roepstorff (born 1972), Danish visual artist